

Events

Pre-1600
 823 – Lothair I is crowned King of Italy by Pope Paschal I.
 919 – The second Fatimid invasion of Egypt begins, when the Fatimid heir-apparent, al-Qa'im bi-Amr Allah, sets out from Raqqada at the head of his army.
1242 – During the Battle on the Ice of Lake Peipus, Russian forces, led by Alexander Nevsky, rebuff an invasion attempt by the Teutonic Knights.
1536 – Charles V makes a Royal Entry into Rome, demolishing a swath of the city to re-enact a Roman triumph.
1566 – Two hundred Dutch noblemen, led by Hendrick van Brederode, force themselves into the presence of Margaret of Parma and present the Petition of Compromise, denouncing the Spanish Inquisition in the Seventeen Provinces.

1601–1900
1614 – In Virginia, Native American Pocahontas marries English colonist John Rolfe.
1621 – The Mayflower sets sail from Plymouth, Massachusetts on a return trip to England.
1792 – United States President George Washington exercises his authority to veto a bill, the first time this power is used in the United States.
1795 – Peace of Basel between France and Prussia is made.
1818 – In the Battle of Maipú, Chile's independence movement, led by Bernardo O'Higgins and José de San Martín, win a decisive victory over Spain, leaving 2,000 Spaniards and 1,000 Chilean patriots dead.
1862 – American Civil War: The Battle of Yorktown begins.
1879 – Bolivia declares war on Chile, and Chile declares war on Peru, starting the War of the Pacific.

1901–present
1902 – A stand box collapses at Ibrox Park (now Ibrox Stadium) in Glasgow, Scotland, which led to the deaths of 25 and injuries to more than 500 supporters during an international association football match between Scotland and England.
1910 – The Transandine Railway connecting Chile and Argentina is inaugurated.
1922 – The American Birth Control League, forerunner of Planned Parenthood, is incorporated.
1932 – Dominion of Newfoundland: Ten thousand rioters seize the Colonial Building leading to the end of self-government.
1933 – U.S. President Franklin D. Roosevelt signs two executive orders: 6101 to establish the Civilian Conservation Corps, and 6102 "forbidding the Hoarding of Gold Coin, Gold Bullion, and Gold Certificates" by U.S. citizens.
  1933   – Andorran Revolution: The Young Andorrans occupy the Casa de la Vall and force the government to hold democratic elections with universal male suffrage.
1936 – Tupelo–Gainesville tornado outbreak: An F5 tornado kills 233 in Tupelo, Mississippi.
1942 – World War II: Adolf Hitler issues Fuhrer Directive No. 41 summarizing Case Blue, including the German Sixth Army's planned assault on Stalingrad.
  1942   – World War II: The Imperial Japanese Navy launches a carrier-based air attack on Colombo, Ceylon during the Indian Ocean raid.
1943 – World War II: United States Army Air Forces bomber aircraft accidentally cause more than 900 civilian deaths, including 209 children, and 1,300 wounded among the civilian population of the Belgian town of Mortsel. Their target was the Erla factory one kilometer from the residential area hit.
1945 – Cold War: Yugoslav leader Josip Broz Tito signs an agreement with the Soviet Union to allow "temporary entry of Soviet troops into Yugoslav territory".
1946 – Soviet troops end their year-long occupation of the Danish island of Bornholm.
  1946   – A Fleet Air Arm Vickers Wellington crashes into a residential area in Rabat, Malta during a training exercise, killing all 4 crew members and 16 civilians on the ground.
1949 – A fire in a hospital in Effingham, Illinois, kills 77 people and leads to nationwide fire code improvements in the United States.
1951 – Cold War: Ethel and Julius Rosenberg are sentenced to death for spying for the Soviet Union.
1956 – Cuban Revolution: Fidel Castro declares himself at war with Cuban President Fulgencio Batista.
1958 – Ripple Rock, an underwater threat to navigation in the Seymour Narrows in Canada is destroyed in one of the largest non-nuclear controlled explosions of the time.
1966 – During the Buddhist Uprising, South Vietnamese Prime Minister Nguyễn Cao Kỳ personally attempted to lead the capture of the restive city of Đà Nẵng before backing down.
1969 – Vietnam War: Massive antiwar demonstrations occur in many U.S. cities.
1971 – In Sri Lanka, Janatha Vimukthi Peramuna launches a revolt against the United Front government of Sirimavo Bandaranaike.
1976 – In China, the April Fifth Movement leads to the Tiananmen Incident.
1977 – The US Supreme Court rules that congressional legislation that diminished the size of the Sioux people's reservation thereby destroyed the tribe's jurisdictional authority over the area in Rosebud Sioux Tribe v. Kneip.
1991 – An ASA EMB 120 crashes in Brunswick, Georgia, killing all 23 aboard including Sen. John Tower and astronaut Sonny Carter.
1992 – Alberto Fujimori, president of Peru, dissolves the Peruvian congress by military force.
  1992   – Peace protesters Suada Dilberovic and Olga Sučić are killed on the Vrbanja Bridge in Sarajevo, becoming the first casualties of the Bosnian War.
1998 – In Japan, the Akashi Kaikyō Bridge opens to traffic, becoming the longest bridge span in the world.
1999 – Two Libyans suspected of bringing down Pan Am Flight 103 in 1988 are handed over for eventual trial in the Netherlands.
2007 – The cruise ship MS Sea Diamond strikes a volcanic reef near Nea Kameni and sinks the next day.  Two passengers were never recovered and are presumed dead.
2009 – North Korea launches its controversial Kwangmyŏngsŏng-2 rocket. The satellite passed over mainland Japan, which prompted an immediate reaction from the United Nations Security Council, as well as participating states of Six-party talks.
2010 – Twenty-nine coal miners are killed in an explosion at the Upper Big Branch Mine in West Virginia.
2018 – Agents with the U.S. Immigration and Customs Enforcement raid a slaughterhouse in Tennessee, detaining nearly 100 undocumented Hispanic workers in one of the largest workplace raids in the history of the United States.
2021 – Nguyễn Xuân Phúc took office as President of Vietnam after dismissing the title of Prime Minister.

Births

Pre-1600
1170 – Isabella of Hainault (d. 1190)
1219 – Wonjong of Goryeo, 24th ruler of Goryeo (d. 1274)
1279 – Al-Nuwayri, Egyptian Muslim historian (d. 1333)
1288 – Emperor Go-Fushimi of Japan (d. 1336)
1315 – James III of Majorca (d. 1349)
1365 – William II, Duke of Bavaria (d. 1417)
1472 – Bianca Maria Sforza, Italian wife of Maximilian I, Holy Roman Emperor (d. 1510)
1521 – Francesco Laparelli, Italian architect (d. 1570)
1523 – Blaise de Vigenère, French cryptographer and diplomat (d. 1596)
1533 – Giulio della Rovere, Italian Catholic Cardinal (d. 1578)
1539 – George Frederick, Margrave of Brandenburg-Ansbach (d. 1603)
1549 – Princess Elizabeth of Sweden (d. 1597)
1568 – Pope Urban VIII (d. 1644)
1588 – Thomas Hobbes, English philosopher (d. 1679)
1591 – Frederick Ulrich, Duke of Brunswick-Luneburg (d. 1634)
1595 – John Wilson, English composer and educator (d. 1674)

1601–1900
1604 – Charles IV, Duke of Lorraine (d. 1675)
1616 – Frederick, Count Palatine of Zweibrücken (d. 1661)
1622 – Vincenzo Viviani, Italian mathematician, astronomer, and physicist (d. 1703)
1649 – Elihu Yale, American-English merchant and philanthropist (d. 1721)
1656 – Nikita Demidov, Russian industrialist (d. 1725)
1664 – Élisabeth Thérèse de Lorraine, French noblewoman and Princess of Epinoy (d. 1748)
1674 – Margravine Elisabeth Sophie of Brandenburg, (d. 1748)
1691 – Louis VIII, Landgrave of Hesse-Darmstadt (d. 1768)
1692 – Adrienne Lecouvreur, French actress (d. 1730)
1719 – Axel von Fersen the Elder, Swedish field marshal and politician, Lord Marshal of Sweden (d. 1794)
1726 – Benjamin Harrison V, American politician, planter and merchant (d. 1791)
1727 – Pasquale Anfossi, Italian violinist and composer (d. 1797)
1729 – Frederick Charles Ferdinand, Duke of Brunswick-Lüneburg (d. 1809)
1730 – Jean Baptiste Seroux d'Agincourt, French archaeologist and historian (d. 1814)
1732 – Jean-Honoré Fragonard, French painter and etcher (d. 1806)
1735 – Franziskus Herzan von Harras, Czech Roman Catholic cardinal (d. 1804)
1739 – Philemon Dickinson, American lawyer and politician (d. 1809)
1752 – Sébastien Érard, French instrument maker (d. 1831)
1761 – Sybil Ludington, American figure of the American Revolutionary War (d. 1839)
1769 – Sir Thomas Hardy, 1st Baronet, English admiral (d. 1839)
1773 – José María Coppinger, governor of Spanish East Florida (d. 1844)
1773 – Duchess Therese of Mecklenburg-Strelitz, (d. 1839)
1777 – Marie Jules César Savigny, French zoologist (d. 1851)
1782 – Wincenty Krasiński, Polish nobleman (d. 1858)
1784 – Louis Spohr, German violinist, composer, and conductor (d. 1859)
1788 – Franz Pforr, German painter (d. 1812)
1793 – Casimir Delavigne, French poet and dramatist (d. 1843)
  1793   – Felix de Muelenaere, Belgian politician (d. 1862)
1795 – Henry Havelock, British general (d. 1857)
1799 – Jacques Denys Choisy, Swiss clergyman and botanist (d. 1859)
1801 – Félix Dujardin, French biologist (d. 1860)
  1801   – Vincenzo Gioberti, Italian philosopher, publicist and politician (d. 1852)
1804 – Matthias Jakob Schleiden, German botanist (d. 1881)
1809 – Karl Felix Halm, German scholar and critic (d. 1882)
1810 – Sir Henry Rawlinson, British East India Company army officer and politician (d. 1895)
1811 – Jules Dupré, French painter (d. 1889)
1814 – Felix Lichnowsky, Czech soldier and politician (d. 1848)
1822 – Émile Louis Victor de Laveleye, Belgian economist (d. 1892)
1827 – Joseph Lister, English surgeon and academic (d. 1912)
1832 – Jules Ferry, French lawyer and politician, 44th Prime Minister of France (d. 1893)
1834 – Prentice Mulford, American humorist and author (d. 1891)
  1834   – Wilhelm Olbers Focke, German medical doctor and botanist (d. 1922)
  1834   – Frank R. Stockton, American writer and humorist (d. 1902)
1835 – Vítězslav Hálek, Czech poet, writer, journalist, dramatist and theatre critic. (d. 1874)
1837 – Algernon Charles Swinburne, English poet, playwright, novelist, and critic (d. 1909)
1839 – Robert Smalls, African-American ship's pilot, sea captain, and politician (d. 1915)
1840 – Ghazaros Aghayan, Armenian historian and linguist (d. 1911)
1842 – Hans Hildebrand, Swedish archaeologist (d. 1913)
1845 – Friedrich Sigmund Merkel, German anatomist and histopathologist (d. 1919)
  1845   – Jules Cambon, French diplomat (d. 1935)
1846 – Sigmund Exner, Austrian physiologist (d. 1926)
  1846   – Henry Wellesley, British peer and politician (d. 1900)
1848 – Thure de Thulstrup, American illustrator (d. 1930)
  1848   – Ulrich Wille, Swiss army general (d. 1925)
1850 – Enrico Mazzanti, Italian engineer and cartoonist (d. 1910)
1852 – Émile Billard, French sailor (d. 1930)
  1852   – Walter W. Winans, American marksman and sculptor (d. 1920)
  1852   – Franz Eckert, German composer and musician (d. 1916)
1856 – Booker T. Washington, African-American educator, essayist and historian (d. 1915)
1857 – Alexander of Battenberg (d. 1893)
1858 – Washington Atlee Burpee, Canadian businessman, founded Burpee Seeds (d. 1915)
1859 – Reinhold Seeberg, German theologian (d. 1935)
1860 – Harry S. Barlow, British tennis player (d. 1917)
1862 – Louis Ganne, French conductor (d. 1923)
  1862   – Leo Stern, English cellist (d. 1904)
1863 – Princess Victoria of Hesse and by Rhine (d. 1950)
1867 – Ernest Lewis, British tennis player (d. 1930)
1869 – Sergey Chaplygin, Russian physicist, mathematician, and engineer (d. 1942)
  1869   – Albert Roussel, French composer (d. 1937)
1870 – Motobu Chōki, Japanese karateka (d. 1944)
1871 – Stanisław Grabski, Polish economist and politician (d. 1949)
1872 – Samuel Cate Prescott, American microbiologist and chemist (d. 1962)
1873 – Joseph Rheden, Austrian astronomer (d. 1946)
1874 – Emmanuel Célestin Suhard, French Cardinal of the Catholic Church (d. 1949)
  1874   – Manuel María Ponce Brousset, President of Peru (d. 1966)
1878 – Albert Champion, French cyclist (d. 1927)
  1878   – Georg Misch, German philosopher (d. 1965)
  1878   – Paul Weinstein, German high jumper (d. 1964)
1879 – Arthur Berriedale Keith, Scottish lawyer (d. 1944)
  1879   – Nikolaus zu Dohna-Schlodien, German naval officer and author (d. 1956)
1880 – Eric Carlberg, Swedish Army officer, diplomat, shooter, fencer and modern pentathlete (d. 1963)
  1880   – Vilhelm Carlberg, Swedish Army officer and shooter (d. 1970)
1882 – Song Jiaoren, Chinese revolutionary (d. 1913)
  1882   – Natalia Sedova, 2nd wife of Leon Trotsky (d. 1962)
1883 – Walter Huston, Canadian-American actor and singer (d. 1950)
1884 – Ion Inculeț, Bessarabian academic and politician, President of Moldova (d. 1940)
1885 – Dimitrie Cuclin, Romanian composer (d. 1978)
1886 – Gotthelf Bergsträsser, German linguist (d. 1933)
  1886   – Frederick Lindemann, British physicist (d. 1957)
  1886   – Gustavo Jiménez, Peruvian colonel and politician, 73rd President of Peru (d. 1933)
1887 – William Cowhig, British gymnast (d. 1964)
1889 – Vicente Ferreira Pastinha, Brazilian martial artist (d. 1981)
1890 – Karl Kirk, Danish gymnast (d. 1955)
  1890   – William Moore, British track and field athlete (d. 1956)
1891 – Arnold Jackson, English runner, soldier, and lawyer (d. 1972)
  1891   – Laura Vicuña, Chilean nun (d. 1904)
1892 – Raymond Bonney, American ice hockey player (d. 1964)
1893 – Frithjof Andersen, Norwegian wrestler (d. 1975)
  1893   – Clas Thunberg, Finnish speed skater (d. 1973)
1894 – Lawrence Dale Bell, American industrialist and founder of Bell Aircraft Corporation (d. 1956)
  1894   – Hans Hüttig, German SS officer (d. 1980)
  1894   – Carl Rudolf Florin, Swedish botanist (d. 1965)
1895 – Mike O'Dowd, American boxer (d. 1957)
1896 – Einar Lundborg, Swedish aviator (d. 1931)
1897 – Hans Schuberth, German politician (d. 1976)
1899 – Alfred Blalock, American surgeon and academic (d. 1964)
1900 – Herbert Bayer, Austrian-American graphic designer, painter, and photographer (d. 1985)
  1900   – Roman Steinberg, Estonian wrestler (d. 1939)
  1900   – Spencer Tracy, American actor (d. 1967)

1901–present
1901 – Curt Bois, German actor (d. 1991)
  1901   – Chester Bowles, American diplomat and ambassador (d. 1986)
  1901   – Melvyn Douglas, American actor (d. 1981)
  1901   – Doggie Julian, American football, basketball, and baseball player and coach (d. 1967)
1902 – Menachem Mendel Schneerson, Russian-American rabbi (d. 1994)
1903 – Marion Aye, American actress (d. 1951)
1904 – Richard Eberhart, American poet and academic (d. 2005)
1906 – Albert Charles Smith, American botanist (d. 1999)
  1906   – Fernando Germani, Italian organist (d. 1998)
  1906   – Ted Morgan, New Zealand boxer (d. 1952)
1907 – Sanya Dharmasakti, Thai jurist (d. 2002)
1908 – Bette Davis, American actress (d. 1989)
  1908   – Kurt Neumann, German director (d. 1958)
  1908   – Jagjivan Ram, Indian politician, 4th Deputy Prime Minister of India (d. 1986)
  1908   – Herbert von Karajan, Austrian conductor and manager (d. 1989)
1909 – Albert R. Broccoli, American film producer, co-founded Eon Productions (d. 1996)
  1909   – Giacomo Gentilomo, Italian film director and painter (d. 2001)
  1909   – Károly Sós, Hungarian footballer and manager (d. 1991)
  1909   – Erwin Wegner, German hurdler (d. 1945)
1910 – Sven Andersson, Swedish politician (d. 1987)
  1910   – Oronzo Pugliese, Italian football manager (d. 1990)
1911 – Hedi Amara Nouira, Tunisian politician (d. 1993)
  1911   – Johnny Revolta, American golfer (d. 1991)
1912 – Jehan Buhan, French fencer (d. 1999)
  1912   – Habib Elghanian, Iranian businessman (d. 1979)
  1912   – Antonio Ferri, Italian scientist (d. 1975)
  1912   – Carlos Guastavino, Argentine composer (d. 2000)
  1912   – Makar Honcharenko, Ukrainian footballer and manager (d. 1997)
  1912   – John Le Mesurier, English actor (d. 1983)
  1912   – István Örkény, Hungarian author and playwright (d. 1979)
  1912   – Bill Roberts, English sprinter and soldier (d. 2001)
1913 – Antoni Clavé, Catalan artist (d. 2005)
  1913   – Nicolas Grunitzky, 2nd President of Togo (d. 1969)
  1913   – Ruth Smith, Faroese artist (d. 1958)
1914 – Felice Borel, Italian footballer (d. 1993)
1916 – Gregory Peck, American actor, political activist, and producer (d. 2003)
1917 – Robert Bloch, American author (d. 1994)
  1917   – Frans Gommers, Belgian footballer (d. 1996)
1919 – Lester James Peries, Sri Lankan director, screenwriter, and producer (d. 2018)
1920 – Barend Biesheuvel, Dutch politician, Prime Minister of the Netherlands (d. 2001)
  1920   – Arthur Hailey, English-Canadian soldier and author (d. 2004)
  1920   – Alfonso Thiele, Turkish-Italian race car driver (d. 1986)
  1920   – John Willem Gran, Swedish bishop (d. 2008)
1921 – Christopher Hewett, English actor and theatre director (d. 2001)
1922 – Tom Finney, English footballer (d. 2014)
  1922   – Harry Freedman, Polish-Canadian horn player, composer, and educator (d. 2005)
  1922   – Andy Linden, American race car driver (d. 1987)
  1922   – Gale Storm, American actress and singer (d. 2009)
1923 – Ernest Mandel, German-born Belgian Marxist economist, Trotskyist activist and theorist (d. 1995)
  1923   – Michael V. Gazzo, American actor (d. 1995)
  1923   – Nguyễn Văn Thiệu, Vietnamese general and politician, 5th President of South Vietnam (d. 2001)
1924 – Igor Borisov, Soviet rower (d. before 2005)
1925 – Janet Rowley, American human geneticist (d. 2013)
  1925   – Pierre Nihant, Belgian cyclist (d. 1993)
1926 – Roger Corman, American actor, director, producer, and screenwriter
  1926   – Liang Yusheng, Chinese writer (d. 2009)
1927 – Thanin Kraivichien, Thai lawyer and politician
  1927   – Arne Hoel, Norwegian ski jumper (d. 2006)
1928 – Enzo Cannavale, Italian actor (d. 2011)
  1928   – Tony Williams, American singer (d. 1992)
1929 – Hugo Claus, Belgian author, poet, and painter (d. 2008)
  1929   – Ivar Giaever, Norwegian-American physicist and academic, Nobel Prize laureate
  1929   – Nigel Hawthorne, English actor and producer (d. 2001)
  1929   – Joe Meek, English songwriter and producer (d. 1967)
  1929   – Mahmoud Mollaghasemi, Iranian wrestler
1930 – Mary Costa, American singer and actress
  1930   – Pierre Lhomme, French director of photography (d. 2019)
1931 – Jack Clement, American singer-songwriter and producer (d. 2013)
  1931   – Héctor Olivera, Argentine director, producer and screenwriter
1933 – Feridun Buğeker, Turkish footballer (d. 2014)
  1933   – Frank Gorshin, American actor (d. 2005)
  1933   – Barbara Holland, American author (d. 2010)
  1933   – K. Kailasapathy, Sri Lankan journalist and academic (d. 1982)
1934 – John Carey, English author and critic
  1934   – Roman Herzog, German lawyer and politician, 7th President of Germany (d. 2017)
  1934   – Moise Safra, Brazilian businessman and philanthropist, co-founded Banco Safra (d. 2014)
  1934   – Stanley Turrentine, American saxophonist and composer (d. 2000)
1935 – Giovanni Cianfriglia, Italian actor
  1935   – Peter Grant, English talent manager (d. 1995)
  1935   – Donald Lynden-Bell, English astrophysicist and astronomer (d. 2018)
  1935   – Frank Schepke, German rower (d. 2017)
1936 – Ronnie Bucknum, American race car driver (d. 1992)
  1936   – Glenn Jordan, American director and producer
  1936   – Dragoljub Minić, Yugoslavian chess Grandmaster (d. 2005)
1937 – Joseph Lelyveld, American journalist and author
  1937   – Colin Powell, American general and politician, 65th United States Secretary of State (d. 2021)
  1937   – Andrzej Schinzel, Polish mathematician (d. 2021)
  1937   – Arie Selinger, Israeli volleyball player and manager
  1937   – Juan Vicente Lezcano, Paraguayan footballer (d. 2012)
1938 – Colin Bland, Zimbabwean-South African cricketer (d. 2018)
  1938   – Mal Colston, Australian educator and politician (d. 2003)
  1938   – Nancy Holt, American sculptor and painter (d. 2014)
  1938   – Natalya Kustinskaya, Soviet actress (d. 2012)
  1938   – Giorgos Sideris, Greek footballer 
1939 – Leka I, Crown Prince of Albania (d. 2011)
  1939   – Crispian St. Peters, English singer-songwriter (d. 2010)
  1939   – Haidar Abu Bakr al-Attas, Prime Minister of Yemen
  1939   – Ronald White, American singer-songwriter (d. 1995)
  1939   – David Winters, English-American actor, choreographer and producer (d. 2019)
1940 – Tommy Cash, American singer-songwriter and guitarist
  1940   – Gilles Proulx, Canadian journalist, historian, and radio host
1941 – Michael Moriarty, American-Canadian actor 
  1941   – Dave Swarbrick, English singer-songwriter and fiddler (d. 2016)
1942 – Allan Clarke, English singer-songwriter
  1942   – Pascal Couchepin, Swiss politician
  1942   – Juan Gisbert Sr., Spanish tennis player
  1942   – Peter Greenaway, Welsh director and screenwriter
1943 – Dean Brown, Australian politician, 41st Premier of South Australia
  1943   – Max Gail, American actor and director
  1943   – Fighting Harada, Japanese boxer
  1943   – Miet Smet, Belgian politician
  1943   – Jean-Louis Tauran, French cardinal (d. 2018)
1944 – Willeke van Ammelrooy, Dutch actress and director
  1944   – János Martonyi, Hungarian politician
  1944   – Evan Parker, British musician
  1944   – Douangchay Phichit, Laotian politician (d. 2014)
  1944   – Willy Planckaert, Belgian cyclist
  1944   – Pedro Rosselló, Puerto Rican physician and politician, 7th Governor of Puerto Rico
  1944   – Peter T. King, American soldier, lawyer, and politician
1945 – Ove Bengtson, Swedish tennis player
  1945   – Steve Carver, American director and producer (d. 2021)
  1945   – Cem Karaca, Turkish musician (d. 2004)
  1945   – Tommy Smith, English footballer (d. 2019)
1946 – Jane Asher, English actress
  1946   – Julio Ángel Fernández, Uruguayan astronomer
  1946   – Björn Granath, Swedish actor (d. 2017)
  1946   – Georgi Markov, Bulgarian Greco-Roman wrestler
1947 – Đurđica Bjedov, Yugoslav swimmer
  1947   – Willy Chirino, Cuban-American musician
  1947   – Gloria Macapagal Arroyo, Filipino academic and politician, 14th President of the Philippines
  1947   – Ramón Mifflin, Peruvian footballer
  1947   – Virendra Sharma, Indian-English lawyer and politician
1948 – Pierre-Albert Chapuisat, Swiss footballer
  1948   – Dave Holland, English drummer (d. 2018)
  1948   – Roy McFarland, English footballer and manager
1949 – Stanley Dziedzic, American wrestler
  1949   – Larry Franco, American film producer
  1949   – Judith Resnik, American engineer and astronaut (d. 1986)
1950 – Ann C. Crispin, American writer (d. 2013)
  1950   – Franklin Chang Díaz, Costa Rican-Chinese American astronaut and physicist
  1950   – Agnetha Fältskog, Swedish singer-songwriter and producer
  1950   – Toshiko Fujita, Japanese actress, singer and narrator (d. 2018)
  1950   – Miki Manojlović, Serbian actor
1951 – Les Binks, Irish drummer and songwriter
  1951   – Yevgeniy Gavrilenko, Belarusian hurdler
  1951   – Nedim Gürsel, Turkish writer
  1951   – Dean Kamen, American inventor and businessman, founded Segway Inc.
  1951   – Dave McArtney, New Zealand singer-songwriter and guitarist (d. 2013)
  1951   – Ubol Ratana, Thai Princess
1952 – Alfie Conn, Scottish international footballer
  1952   – John C. Dvorak, American author and editor
  1952   – Sandy Mayer, American tennis player
  1952   – Dennis Mortimer, English footballer
  1952   – Mitch Pileggi, American actor
1953 – Frank Gaffney, American journalist and radio host
  1953   – Keiko Han, Japanese actress
  1953   – Tae Jin-ah, South Korean singer
  1953   – Raleb Majadele, Israeli politician
  1953   – Ian Swales, English accountant and politician
1954 – Guy Bertrand, Canadian linguist and radio host
  1954   – Peter Case, American singer-songwriter and guitarist
  1954   – Mohamed Ben Mouza, Tunisian footballer
  1954   – Stan Ridgway, American singer-songwriter and guitarist
  1954   – Yoshiichi Watanabe, Japanese footballer
1955 – Charlotte de Turckheim, French actress, producer, and screenwriter
  1955   – Ricardo Ferrero, Argentine footballer (d. 2015)
  1955   – Christian Gourcuff, French footballer and manager
  1955   – Anthony Horowitz, English author and screenwriter
  1955   – Bernard Longley, English prelate
  1955   – Akira Toriyama, Japanese illustrator
  1955   – Takayoshi Yamano, Japanese footballer 
1956 – Diamond Dallas Page, American wrestler and actor
  1956   – Leonid Fedun, Russian businessman
  1956   – Reid Ribble, American politician
1957 – Sebastian Adayanthrath, Indian bishop
  1957   – Karin Roßley, German hurdler
1958 – Kevin Dann, Australian rugby league player (d. 2021)
  1958   – Henrik Dettmann, Finnish basketball coach
  1958   – Ryoichi Kawakatsu, Japanese footballer
  1958   – Johan Kriek, South African-American tennis player
  1958   – Daniel Schneidermann, French journalist
  1958   – Lasantha Wickrematunge, Sri Lankan lawyer and journalist (d. 2009)
1959 – Paul Chung, Hong Kong actor and host (d. 1989)
1960 – Asteris Koutoulas, Romanian-German record producer, manager, and author
  1960   – Larry McCray, American singer-songwriter and guitarist
  1960   – Ian Redford, Scottish footballer and manager (d. 2014)
  1960   – Hiromi Taniguchi, Japanese long-distance runner
  1960   – Adnan Terzić, Bosnian politician
1961 – Andrea Arnold, English filmmaker and actress
  1961   – Anna Caterina Antonacci, Italian soprano
  1961   – Abdulhadi al-Khawaja, Bahraini-Danish human rights activist
  1961   – Lisa Zane, American actress and singer
1962 – Lana Clarkson, American actress and model (d. 2003)
  1962   – Sara Danius, Swedish scholar of literature and aesthetics (d. 2019)
  1962   – Richard Gough, Swedish born Scottish international footballer
  1962   – Arild Monsen, Norwegian cross-country skier
  1962   – Kirsan Ilyumzhinov, Russian businessman and politician, 1st President of Kalmykia
1963 – Arthur Adams, American comic book artist and writer
1964 – Neil Eckersley, British judoka
  1964   – Vakhtang Iagorashvili, Soviet modern pentathlete
  1964   – Levon Julfalakyan, Soviet Armenian Greco-Roman wrestler
  1964   – Marius Lăcătuș, Romanian footballer and coach
1965 – Aykut Kocaman, Turkish footballer and manager
  1965   – Lang Tzu-yun, Taiwanese actress
  1965   – Elizabeth McIntyre, American freestyle skier
  1965   – Svetlana Paramygina, Belarusian biathlete
1966 – Yoon Hyun, South Korean judoka
  1966   – Mike McCready, American guitarist and songwriter
  1966   – Peter Overton, English-Australian journalist and television host
1967 – Troy Gentry, American singer-songwriter and guitarist (d. 2017)
  1967   – Franck Silvestre, French footballer
  1967   – Erland Johnsen, Norwegian footballer
  1967   – Laima Zilporytė, Soviet cyclist
1968 – Paula Cole, American singer-songwriter and pianist
1969 – Dinos Angelidis, Greek basketball player
  1969   – Viatcheslav Djavanian, Russian cyclist
  1969   – Pontus Kåmark, Swedish footballer
  1969   – Pavlo Khnykin, Ukrainian swimmer
  1969   – Tomislav Piplica, Bosnian footballer and manager
  1969   – Ravindra Prabhat, Indian writer and journalist
1970 – Soheil Ayari, French race car driver
  1970   – Valérie Bonneton, French actress
  1970   – Diamond D, American hip hop producer
  1970   – Petar Genov, Bulgarian chess grandmaster
  1970   – Thea Gill, Canadian actress
  1970   – Miho Hatori, Japanese singer-songwriter
  1970   – Irina Timofeyeva, Russian long-distance runner
1971 – Dong Abay, Filipino singer-songwriter and guitarist
  1971   – Krista Allen, American actress
  1971   – Austin Berry, Costa Rican footballer
  1971   – Simona Cavallari, Italian actress
  1971   – Victoria Hamilton, English actress
  1971   – Nelson Parraguez, Chilean footballer
  1971   – Kim Soo-nyung, South Korean archer
1972 – Nima Arkani-Hamed, American-Canadian theoretical physicist
  1972   – Tom Coronel, Dutch race car driver
  1972   – Paul Okon, Australian footballer and manager
  1972   – Duncan Spencer, English cricketer
  1972   – Yasuhiro Takemoto, Japanese animator and director (d. 2019)
  1972   – Junko Takeuchi, Japanese actress
1973 – Élodie Bouchez, French-American actress
  1973   – Brendan Cannon, Australian rugby player
  1973   – Lidia Trettel, Italian snowboarder
  1973   – Pharrell Williams, American singer, songwriter and rapper
1974 – Sandra Bagarić, Croatian opera singer and actress
  1974   – Julien Boutter, French tennis player
  1974   – Katja Holanti, Finnish biathlete
  1974   – Oleg Khodkov, Russian handball player
  1974   – Ariel López, Argentine footballer
  1974   – Lukas Ridgeston, Slovak actor and director 
  1974   – Vyacheslav Voronin, Russian high jumper
1975 – Sarah Baldock, English organist and conductor
  1975   – John Hartson, Welsh footballer and coach
  1975   – Juicy J, American rapper and producer
  1975   – Serhiy Klymentiev, Ukrainian ice hockey player
  1975   – Caitlin Moran, English journalist, author, and critic
  1975   – Marcos Vales, Spanish footballer
  1975   – Shammond Williams, American basketball player and coach
1976 – Luis de Agustini, Uruguayan footballer
  1976   – Péter Biros, Hungarian water polo player
  1976   – Sterling K. Brown, American actor
  1976   – Aleksei Budõlin, Estonian judoka
  1976   – Simone Inzaghi, Italian footballer
  1976   – Fernando Morientes, Spanish footballer and coach
  1976   – Natascha Ragosina, Russian boxer
  1976   – Henrik Stenson, Swedish golfer
  1976   – Valeria Straneo, Italian long-distance runner
  1976   – Indrek Tobreluts, Estonian biathlete
  1976   – Anouska van der Zee, Dutch cyclist
1977 – Jonathan Erlich, Israeli tennis player
  1977   – Trevor Letowski, Canadian ice hockey player and coach
  1977   – Daniel Majstorović, Swedish footballer
1978 – Dwain Chambers, British track sprinter
  1978   – Marcone Amaral Costa, Qatari footballer
  1978   – Tarek El-Said, Egyptian footballer
  1978   – Jairo Patiño, Colombian footballer
  1978   – Sohyang, South Korean singer
  1978   – Stephen Jackson, American basketball player
  1978   – Arnaud Tournant, French cyclist
  1978   – Franziska van Almsick, German swimmer
  1978   – Günther Weidlinger, Austrian long-distance runner
1979 – Vlada Avramov, Serbian footballer
  1979   – Josh Boone, American screenwriter and director
  1979   – Song Dae-nam, South Korean judoka
  1979   – Timo Hildebrand, German footballer
  1979   – Imany, French singer
  1979   – Barel Mouko, Congolese footballer
  1979   – Cesare Natali, Italian footballer
  1979   – Mitsuo Ogasawara, Japanese footballer
  1979   – Alexander Resch, German luger
  1979   – Andrius Velička, Lithuanian footballer
  1979   – Dante Wesley, American football player
  1979   – Chen Yanqing, Chinese weightlifter
1980 – Matt Bonner, American basketball player
  1980   – Alberta Brianti, Italian tennis player
  1980   – Rafael Cavalcante, Brazilian mixed martial artist
  1980   – David Chocarro, Argentinian baseball player and actor
  1980   – Mike Glumac, Canadian ice hockey player
  1980   – Mario Kasun, Croatian basketball player
  1980   – Lee Jae-won, South Korean DJ and singer
  1980   – Joris Mathijsen, Dutch footballer
  1980   – Rasmus Quist Hansen, Danish rower
  1980   – Odlanier Solís, Cuban boxer
1981 – Matthew Emmons, American rifle shooter
  1981   – Michael A. Monsoor, American sailor, Medal of Honor recipient (d. 2006)
  1981   – Mariqueen Maandig, Filipino-American musician and singer-songwriter
  1981   – Daba Modibo Keïta, Malian taekwondo athlete
  1981   – Marissa Nadler, American musician
  1981   – Tom Riley, English actor and producer
  1981   – Mompati Thuma, Botswana footballer
  1981   – Pieter Weening, Dutch cyclist
1982 – Hayley Atwell, English-American actress
  1982   – Matheus Coradini Vivian, Brazilian footballer
  1982   – Thomas Hitzlsperger, German footballer
  1982   – Kelly Pavlik, American boxer
  1982   – Matt Pickens, American soccer player
  1982   – Alexandre Prémat, French race car driver
  1982   – Danylo Sapunov, Ukrainian-Kazakhstani triathlete
  1982   – Hubert Schwab, Swiss cyclist
  1982   – Marcel Seip, Dutch former footballer
1983 – Jaime Castrillón, Colombian footballer 
  1983   – Jorge Andrés Martínez, Uruguayan footballer
  1983   – Brock Radunske, Canadian-South Korean ice hockey player
  1983   – Yohann Sangaré, French basketball player
  1983   – Cécile Storti, French cross-country skier
  1983   – Shikha Uberoi, Indian-American tennis player
1984 – Marshall Allman, American actor
  1984   – Aram Mp3, Armenian singer and comedian
  1984   – Rune Brattsveen, Norwegian biathlete
  1984   – Alexei Glukhov, Russian ice hockey player
  1984   – Maartje Goderie, Dutch field hockey player
  1984   – Darija Jurak, Croatian tennis player
  1984   – Dejan Kelhar, Slovenian footballer
  1984   – Dmitry Kozonchuk, Russian cyclist
  1984   – Shin Min-a, South Korean actress
  1984   – Jess Sum, Hong Kong actress
  1984   – Peter Penz, Austrian luger
  1984   – Samuele Preisig, Swiss footballer
  1984   – Cristian Săpunaru, Romanian footballer
  1984   – Fabio Vitaioli, San Marinese footballer
  1984   – Kisho Yano, Japanese footballer
  1984   – Saba Qamar, Pakistani actress-model
1985 – Daniel Congré, French footballer
  1985   – Erwin l'Ami, Dutch chess player
  1985   – Jolanda Keizer, Dutch heptathlete
  1985   – Sergey Khachatryan, Armenian violinist
  1985   – Linas Pilibaitis, Lithuanian footballer
  1985   – Jan Smeets, Dutch chess grandmaster
  1985   – Kristof Vandewalle, Belgian cyclist
1986 – Anna Sophia Berglund, American model and actress
  1986   – Anzor Boltukayev, Chechen wrestler
  1986   – Diego Chará, Colombian footballer
  1986   – Charlotte Flair, American wrestler, author and actress
  1986   – Róbert Kasza, Hungarian Modern pentathlete
  1986   – Eetu Muinonen, Finnish footballer
  1986   – Manuel Ruz, Spanish footballer
  1986   – Albert Selimov, Azerbaijani boxer
1987 – Max Grün, German footballer
  1987   – Balázs Hárai, Hungarian water polo player
  1987   – Anton Kokorin, Russian sprint athlete
  1987   – Fyodor Kudryashov, Russian footballer
  1987   – Etiënne Reijnen, Dutch footballer
1988 – Gerson Acevedo, Chilean footballer
  1988   – Teresa Almeida, Angolan handball player
  1988   – Quade Cooper, New Zealand-Australian rugby player and boxer
  1988   – Jonathan Davies, Welsh rugby union player
  1988   – Gevorg Ghazaryan, Armenian footballer
  1988   – Alisha Glass, American ex-indoor volleyball player
  1988   – Vurğun Hüseynov, Azerbaijani footballer
  1988   – Matthias Jaissle, German footballer and manager
  1988   – Jon Kwang-ik, North Korean footballer
  1988   – Christopher Papamichalopoulos, Cypriot skier
  1988   – Zack Smith, Canadian ice hockey player
  1988   – Pape Sy, French basketball player
  1988   – Alexey Volkov, Russian biathlete
1989 – Kader Amadou, Nigerien footballer
  1989   – Yémi Apithy, Beninese fencer
  1989   – Liemarvin Bonevacia, Dutch sprinter
  1989   – Freddie Fox, English actor
  1989   – Emre Güral, Turkish footballer
  1989   – Justin Holiday, American basketball player
  1989   – Rachel Homan, Canadian curler
  1989   – Lily James, English actress
  1989   – Trevor Marsicano, American speed skater
  1989   – Jonathan Rossini, Swiss footballer
  1989   – Kiki Sukezane, Japanese actress
  1989   – Sosuke Takatani, Japanese wrestler
1990 – Amer Said Al-Shatri, Omani footballer
  1990   – Alex Cuthbert, Welsh rugby player
  1990   – Patrick Dangerfield, Australian footballer
  1990   – Fredy Hinestroza, Colombian footballer
  1990   – Chen Huijia, Chinese swimmer
  1990   – Haruma Miura, Japanese actor and singer (d. 2020)
  1990   – Ismaeel Mohammad, Qatari footballer
  1990   – Iryna Pamialova, Belarusian canoeist
  1990   – Jakub Sedláček, Czech ice hockey player
  1990   – Sercan Yıldırım, Turkish footballer
  1990   – Género Zeefuik, Dutch footballer
1991 – Yassine Bounou, Moroccan footballer
  1991   – Nathaniel Clyne, English footballer
  1991   – Adriano Grimaldi, Italian-German footballer
  1991   – Joël Mall, Swiss footballer
  1991   – Guilherme dos Santos Torres, Brazilian footballer
1992 – Emmalyn Estrada, Canadian singer-songwriter and dancer
  1992   – Shintaro Kurumaya, Japanese footballer
  1992   – Kaveh Rezaei, Iranian footballer
  1992   – Dmytro Ryzhuk, Ukrainian footballer
1993 – Andreas Bouchalakis, Greek footballer
  1993   – Maya DiRado, American swimmer
  1993   – Laura Feiersinger, Austrian footballer
  1993   – Benjamin Garcia, French rugby league player
  1993   – Scottie Wilbekin, American-Turkish basketball player 
1994 – Mateusz Bieniek, Polish volleyball player
  1994   – Edem Rjaïbi, Tunisian footballer
  1994   – Richard Sánchez, Mexican footballer
1995 – Viliame Kikau, Fijian rugby league player
  1995   – Sei Muroya, Japanese footballer
  1995   – Gleb Rassadkin, Belarusian footballer
  1995   – Sebastian Starke Hedlund, Swedish footballer
1996 – Nicolas Beer, Danish race car driver
  1996   – Raouf Benguit, Algerian footballer
1997 – Borja Mayoral, Spanish footballer
2000 – Ayush Mahesh Khedekar, Indian actor
2001 – Thylane Blondeau, French model and actress

Deaths

Pre-1600
 517 – Timothy I of Constantinople, Byzantine patriarch
 582 – Eutychius of Constantinople, Byzantine patriarch 
 584 – Ruadán of Lorrha, Irish abbot
 902 – Al-Mu'tadid, Abbasid caliph
1168 – Robert de Beaumont, 2nd Earl of Leicester, English politician (b. 1104)
1183 – Ramon Berenguer III, Spanish count of Cerdanya and Provence
1205 – Isabella I of Jerusalem, queen regnant of Jerusalem (b. 1172)
1258 – Juliana of Liège, Belgian canoness and saint
1308 – Ivan Kőszegi, Hungarian baron and oligarch
1325 – Ralph de Monthermer, 1st Baron of Monthermer and Earl of Gloucester (b. c.1270)
1419 – Vincent Ferrer, Spanish missionary and saint (b. 1350)
1431 – Bernard I, margrave of Baden-Baden (b. 1364)
1512 – Lazzaro Bastiani, Italian painter (b. 1429)
1534 – Jan Matthys, Dutch anabaptist reformer
1594 – Catherine of Palma, Spanish nun (b. 1533)

1601–1900
1612 – Diana Scultori, Italian engraver
1617 – Alonso Lobo, Spanish composer (b. 1555)
1626 – Anna Koltovskaya, Russian tsarina 
1673 – François Caron, Belgian-French explorer and politician, 8th Governor of Formosa (b. 1600)
1679 – Anne Geneviève de Bourbon, French princess (b. 1619)
1684 – William Brouncker, English mathematician (b. 1620)
  1684   – Karl Eusebius, prince of Liechtenstein (b. 1611)
1693 – Anne Marie Louise d'Orléans, French noblewoman (b. 1627)
  1693   – Philip William August, German nobleman (b. 1668)
1695 – George Savile, English politician, Lord President of the Council (b. 1633)
1697 – Charles XI, king of Sweden (b. 1655)
1704 – Christian Ulrich I, German nobleman and Duke of Württemberg-Oels (b. 1652)
1708 – Christian Heinrich, German prince and member of the House of Hohenzollern (b. 1661)
1709 – Roger de Piles, French painter, engraver, art critic and diplomat (b. 1635)
1712 – Jan Luyken, Dutch poet, illustrator and engraver (b. 1649)
1717 – Jean Jouvenet, French painter (b. 1647)
1723 – Johann Bernhard Fischer von Erlach, Austrian architect, sculptor and historian (b. 1656)
1735 – William Derham, English minister and philosopher (b. 1657)
1751 – Frederick I, prince consort and king of Sweden (b. 1676)
1765 – Edward Young, English poet and author (b. 1683)
1767 – Princess Charlotte Wilhelmine of Saxe-Coburg-Saalfeld, German princess of Saxe-Coburg-Saalfeld (b. 1685)
1768 – Egidio Forcellini, Italian philologist (b. 1688)
1769 – Marc-Antoine Laugier, Jesuit priest (b. 1713)
1794 – Georges Danton, French lawyer and politician, French Minister of Justice (b. 1759)
  1794   – François Chabot, French politician (b. 1756)
  1794   – Camille Desmoulins, French journalist, lawyer, and politician (b. 1760)
  1794   – Fabre d'Églantine, French actor, dramatist, poet and politician (b. 1750)
  1794   – Marie-Jean Hérault de Séchelles, French judge and politician (b. 1759)
  1794   – Pierre Philippeaux, French lawyer (b. 1754)
  1794   – François Joseph Westermann, French general (b. 1751)
1799 – Johann Christoph Gatterer, German historian (b. 1727)
1804 – Jean-Charles Pichegru, French general (b. 1761)
1808 – Johann Georg Wille, German engraver (b. 1715)
1830 – Richard Chenevix, Irish chemist and playwright (b. 1774)
1831 – Pierre Léonard Vander Linden, Belgian entomologist (b. 1797)
1842 – Shah Shujah Durrani, 5th Emir of Afghanistan (b. 1785)
1852 – Prince Felix of Schwarzenberg, (b. 1800)
1861 – Ferdinand Joachimsthal, German mathematician (b. 1818)
1862 – Barend Cornelis Koekkoek, Dutch artist (b. 1803)
1865 – Manfredo Fanti, Italian general (b. 1806)
1866 – Thomas Hodgkin, British physician (b. 1798)
1868 – Karel Purkyně, Czech painter (b. 1834)
1871 – Paolo Savi, Italian geologist and ornithologist (b. 1798)
1872 – Paul-Auguste-Ernest Laugier, French astronomer (b. 1812)
1873 – Milivoje Blaznavac, Serbian soldier and politician (b. 1824)
1882 – Pierre Guillaume Frédéric le Play, (b. 1806)
1888 – Vsevolod Garshin, Russian author (b. 1855)
1891 – Johann Hermann Bauer, (b. 1861)
1900 – Joseph Bertrand, French mathematician, economist, and academic (b. 1822)
  1900   – Osman Nuri Pasha, Ottoman field marshal and the hero of the Siege of Plevna in 1877 (b. 1832)

1901–present

1901 – Angelo Messedaglia, Italian social scientist and statistician (b. 1820)
1902 – Hans Ernst August Buchner, German bacteriologist (b. 1850)
1904 – Ernst Leopold, 4th Prince of Leiningen (b. 1830)
  1904   – Frances Power Cobbe, Irish writer (b. 1822)
1906 – Eastman Johnson, American painter (b. 1824)
1914 – Bernard Borggreve, German forestry scientist (b. 1836)
1916 – Maksim Kovalevsky, Russian sociologist (b. 1851)
1918 – George Tupou II, King of Tonga (b. 1874)
  1918   – Paul Vidal de La Blache, French geographer (b. 1845)
1920 – Laurent Marqueste, French sculptor (b. 1848)
1921 – Alphons Diepenbrock, Dutch composer (b. 1862)
  1921   – Sophie Elkan, Swedish writer and translator (b. 1853)
1923 – George Herbert, 5th Earl of Carnarvon, English archaeologist and businessman (b. 1866)
1924 – Victor Hensen, German zoologist (b. 1835)
1928 – Roy Kilner, English cricketer and soldier (b. 1890)
  1928   – Viktor Oliva, Czech painter and illustrator (b. 1861)
1929 – Francis Aidan Gasquet, English Benedictine monk (b. 1846)
  1929   – Ludwig von Sybel, German archeologist (b. 1846)
1932 – María Blanchard, Spanish painter (b. 1881)
1933 – Earl Derr Biggers, American novelist and playwright (b. 1884)
  1933   – Hjalmar Mellin, Finnish mathematician and functional theorist (b. 1854)
1934 – Salvatore Di Giacomo, Italian poet, playwright, songwriter and fascist intellectual (b. 1860)
  1934   – Jiro Sato, Japanese tennis player (b. 1908)
1935 – Achille Locatelli, Roman Catholic cardinal (b. 1856)
  1935   – Emil Młynarski, Polish conductor, violinist, composer, and pedagogue (b. 1870)
  1935   – Franz von Vecsey, Hungarian violinist and composer (b. 1893)
1936 – Chandler Egan, American golfer and architect (b. 1884)
1937 – Gustav Adolf Deissmann, (b. 1866)
  1937   – José Benlliure y Gil, Spanish painter (b. 1858)
1938 – Helena Westermarck, Finnish artist and writer (b. 1857)
  1938   – Verner Lehtimäki, Finnish revolutionary (b. 1890)
1940 – Charles Freer Andrews, English-Indian priest, missionary, and educator (b. 1871)
  1940   – Robert Maillart, Swiss civil engineer (b. 1872)
  1940   – Jay O'Brien, American bobsledder (b. 1883)
  1940   – Song Zheyuan, Chinese general (b. 1885)
1941 – Parvin E'tesami, Persian poet (b. 1907)
  1941   – Nigel Gresley, Scottish-English engineer (b. 1876)
  1941   – Franciszek Kleeberg, Polish general (b. 1888)
1945 – Heinrich Borgmann, German officer (b. 1912)
  1945   – Karl-Otto Koch, German SS officer (b. 1897)
1946 – Vincent Youmans, American composer and producer (b. 1898)
1947 – Bernhard Pankok, German painter, artist and architect (b. 1872)
  1947   – Elis Strömgren, Swedish-Danish astronomer (b. 1870)
1948 – Abby Aldrich Rockefeller, American socialite and philanthropist (b. 1874)
1949 – Erich Zeigner, Prime Minister of Saxony (b. 1886)
1950 – Hiroshi Yoshida, Japanese painter (b. 1876)
1952 – Agnes Morton, British tennis player (b.
1954 – Princess Märtha of Sweden, (b. 1901)
  1954   – Claude Delvincourt, French pianist and composer (b. 1888)
1955 – Tibor Szele, Hungarian mathematician (b. 1918)
1956 – William Titt, British gymnast (b. 1881)
1958 – Prince Ferdinand of Bavaria, (b. 1884)
  1958   – Ásgrímur Jónsson, Icelandic painter (b. 1876)
  1958   – Isidora Sekulić, Serbian writer (b. 1877)
1961 – Nikolai Kryukov, Russian composer (b. 1908)
1962 – Boo Kullberg, Swedish gymnast (b. 1889)
1963 – Jacobus Oud, Dutch architect (b. 1890)
1964 – James Chapin, American ornithologist (b. 1889)
  1964   – Aloïse Corbaz, Swiss artist (b. 1886)
  1964   – Douglas MacArthur, American general (b. 1880)
1965 – Pedro Sernagiotto, Italian-Brazilian footballer (b. 1908)
  1965   – Sándor Szalay, Hungarian figure skater (b. 1893)
1967 – Mischa Elman, Ukrainian-American violinist (b. 1891)
  1967   – Johan Falkberget, Norwegian author (b. 1879)
  1967   – Hermann Joseph Muller, American geneticist and academic, Nobel Prize laureate (b. 1890)
  1967   – Herbert Johnston, British runner (b. 1902)
1968 – Félix Couchoro, Togolese writer (b. 1900)
  1968   – Lajos Csordás, Hungarian footballer
  1968   – Giuseppe Paris, Italian gymnast (b. 1895)
1969 – Alberto Bonucci, Italian actor and director (b. 1918)
  1969   – Rómulo Gallegos, Venezuelan novelist and politician (b. 1917)
  1969   – Ain-Ervin Mere, Estonian SS officer (b. 1903)
1970 – Louisa Bolus, South African botanist and taxonomist (b. 1877)
  1970   – Alfred Sturtevant, American geneticist and academic (b. 1891)
  1970   – Karl von Spreti, German diplomat (b. 1907)
1971 – José Cubiles, Spanish pianist and conductor (b. 1894)
1973 – David Murray, British race car driver (b. 1909)
  1973   – Isabel Jewell, American actress and singer (b. 1907)
  1973   – Alla Tarasova, Russian ballerina (b. 1898)
1974 – Bino Bini, Italian fencer (b. 1900)
  1974   – A. Y. Jackson, Canadian painter (b. 1882)
1975 – Tell Berna, American middle and long-distance runner (b. 1891)
  1975   – Victor Marijnen, Dutch politician (b. 1917)
  1975   – Chiang Kai-shek, Chinese general and politician, 1st President of the Republic of China (b. 1887)
  1975   – Harold Osborn, American track and fielder (b. 1899)
1976 – Howard Hughes, American pilot, engineer, and director (b. 1905)
  1976   – Wilder Penfield, American-Canadian surgeon and academic (b. 1891)
  1976   – Harry Wyld, British cyclist (b. 1900)
1977 – Carlos Prío Socarrás, President of Cuba, (b. 1903)
  1977   – Yuri Zavadsky, Russian actor and director (b. 1894)
1981 – Émile Hanse, Belgian footballer (b. 1892)
  1981   – Bob Hite, American singer-songwriter (b. 1945)
  1981   – Pinchus Kremegne, French artist (b. 1890)
1982 – Abe Fortas, American lawyer and jurist (b. 1910)
1983 – Abd al-Quddus al-Ansari, Saudi Arabian historian, journalist and writer. (b. 1907) 
1984 – Hans Lunding, Danish military officer (b. 1899)
  1984   – Giuseppe Tucci, Italian scholar of oriental cultures (b. 1894)
1986 – Manly Wade Wellman, American writer (b. 1903)
1987 – Leabua Jonathan, 2nd Prime Minister of Lesotho (b. 1914)
1988 – Alf Kjellin, Swedish actor and director (b. 1920)
1989 – Frank Foss, American pole vaulter (b. 1895)
  1989   – Karel Zeman, Czech director, artist, production designer and animator (b. 1910)
1991 – Sonny Carter, American soccer player, physician, and astronaut (b. 1947)
  1991   – Jay Miller, American basketball player (b. 1943)
  1991   – Jiří Mucha, Czech journalist, writer and screenwriter (b. 1915)
  1991   – William Sidney, 1st Viscount De L'Isle (b. 1909)
  1991   – John Tower, American soldier, academic, and politician (b. 1925)
1992 – Takeshi Inoue, Japanese footballer (b. 1928)
  1992   – Molly Picon, American actress (b. 1898)
  1992   – Sam Walton, American businessman, founded Walmart and Sam's Club (b. 1918)
1993 – Divya Bharti, Indian actress (b. 1974)
1994 – Kurt Cobain, American singer-songwriter and guitarist (b. 1967)
1995 – Nicolaas Cortlever, Dutch chess player (b. 1915)
  1995   – Emilio Greco, Italian sculptor and engraver (b. 1913)
  1995   – Christian Pineau, French Resistance fighter (b. 1904)
1996 – Charlene Holt, American actress (b. 1928)
1997 – Allen Ginsberg, American poet (b. 1926)
1998 – Frederick Charles Frank, British theoretical physicist (b. 1911)
  1998   – Cozy Powell, English drummer (b. 1947)
1999 – Giulio Einaudi, Italian book publisher (b. 1912)
2000 – Heinrich Müller, Austrian footballer (b. 1909)
  2000   – Lee Petty, American race car driver (b. 1914)
2001 – Aldo Olivieri, Italian footballer (b. 1910)
2002 – Layne Staley, American singer-songwriter (b. 1967)
  2002   – Kim Won-gyun, North Korean composer and politician (b. 1917)
2003 – Keizo Morishita, Japanese painter (b. 1944)
2004 – Fernand Goyvaerts, Belgian footballer (b. 1938)
  2004   – Sławomir Rawicz, Polish lieutenant (b. 1915)
  2004   – Heiner Zieschang, German mathematician and academic (b. 1936)
2005 – Saul Bellow, Canadian-American novelist, essayist and short story writer, Nobel Prize laureate (b. 1915)
  2005   – Robert Borg, American military officer and equestrian (b. 1913)
  2005   – Chung Nam-sik, South Korean footballer (b. 1917)
2006 – Allan Kaprow, American painter and educator (b. 1927)
  2006   – Gene Pitney, American singer-songwriter (b. 1941)
  2006   – Yevgeny Seredin, Russian swimmer (b. 1958)
  2006   – Pasquale Macchi, Roman Catholic archbishop (b. 1923)
2007 – Maria Gripe, Swedish journalist and author (b. 1923)
  2007   – Leela Majumdar, Indian author and academic (b. 1908)
  2007   – Werner Maser, German historian and journalist (b. 1922)
  2007   – Mark St. John, American guitarist (b. 1956)
  2007   – Thomas Stoltz Harvey, American pathologist (b. 1912)
2008 – Charlton Heston, American actor, director, and political activist (b. 1923)
2009 – I. J. Good, British mathematician (b. 1916)
2010 – Vitaly Sevastyanov, Soviet cosmonaut and engineer (b. 1935)
2011 – Baruch Samuel Blumberg, American physician and geneticist (b. 1925)
  2011   – Ange-Félix Patassé, Central African politician (b. 1937)
2012 – Ferdinand Alexander Porsche, German designer (b. 1935)
  2012   – Pedro Bartolomé Benoit, Dominican Republican politician military officer
  2012   – Jim Marshall, English businessman, founded Marshall Amplification (b. 1923)
  2012   – Barney McKenna, Irish musician (b. 1939)
  2012   – Bingu wa Mutharika, Malawian economist and politician, 3rd President of Malawi (b. 1934)
2013 – Regina Bianchi, Italian actress (b. 1921)
  2013   – Piero de Palma, Italian tenor and actor (b. 1924)
  2013   – Nikolaos Pappas, Greek Navy admiral (b. 1930) 
2014 – Alan Davie, Scottish saxophonist and painter (b. 1920)
  2014   – Mariano Díaz, Spanish cyclist (b. 1939)
  2014   – Peter Matthiessen, American novelist, short story writer, editor, co-founded The Paris Review (b. 1927)
  2014   – John Pinette, American comedian (b. 1964)
  2014   – José Wilker, Brazilian actor, director, and producer (b. 1947)
2015 – Fredric Brandt, American dermatologist and author (b. 1949)
  2015   – Juan Carlos Cáceres, Argentinian singer and pianist (b. 1936)
2016 – Koço Kasapoğlu, Turkish footballer (b. 1936)
2017 – Attilio Benfatto, Italian cyclist (b. 1943)
  2017   – Arthur Bisguier, American chess Grandmaster (b. 1929)
  2017   – Paul G. Comba, Italian-American computer scientist and astronomer (b. 1926)
  2017   – Makoto Ōoka, Japanese poet and literary critic (b. 1931)
  2017   – Paul O'Neill, American rock composer and producer (b. 1956)
  2017   – Tim Parnell, British race car driver (b. 1932)
  2017   – Memè Perlini, Italian actor and director (b. 1947)
  2017   – Atanase Sciotnic, Romanian sprint canoeist (b. 1942)
  2017   – Ilkka Sinisalo, Finnish ice hockey player (b. 1958)
2018 – Isao Takahata, Japanese director (b. 1935)
2019 – Sydney Brenner, South African biologist (b. 1927)
2021 – Paul Ritter, English actor (b. 1966)
2022 – Nehemiah Persoff, Israeli-American actor (b. 1919)
2022     – Jimmy Wang Yu,  Taiwanese actor (b.1943)

Holidays and observances
Christian feast day:
Albert of Montecorvino
Derfel Gadarn
Æthelburh of Kent
Gerald of Sauve-Majeure
Juliana of Liège
Maria Crescentia Höss
Blessed Mariano de la Mata
Pandita Mary Ramabai (Episcopal Church (USA)) 
Ruadhán of Lorrha
Vincent Ferrer
April 5 (Eastern Orthodox liturgics)
Cold Food Festival, held on April 4 if it is a leap year (China); and its related observances:
Earliest day on which Sham el-Nessim can fall, while May 9 is the latest; celebrated on Monday after the Orthodox Easter (Egypt)
Children's Day (Palestinian territories)
First Contact Day (International observance)
Sikmogil (South Korea)
National Maritime Day is observed in India, in commemoration of the first voyage of SS Loyalty of the Scindia Steam Navigation Company Ltd. in 1919.
 International Day of Conscience

Other
 April the Fifth (1929–1954), British Thoroughbred racehorse
  (ends 5 April)

References

External links

 BBC: On This Day
 
 Historical Events on April 5

Days of the year
April